A partial solar eclipse occurred on Friday, October 21, 1949. A solar eclipse occurs when the Moon passes between Earth and the Sun, thereby totally or partly obscuring the image of the Sun for a viewer on Earth. A partial solar eclipse occurs in the polar regions of the Earth when the center of the Moon's shadow misses the Earth.

Related eclipses

Solar eclipses 1946–1949

References

External links 

1949 in science
1949 10 21
October 1949 events